Emily Thomson (born 12 August 1993) is a Scottish football winger, who plays for Glasgow City in the Scottish Women's Premier League. She has represented the Scotland women's national football team at youth and senior level.

Club career
In 2009 Thomson left Motherwell Girls and signed a two-year contract to join the academy of English champions Arsenal Ladies. She returned to Scotland to join Celtic in 2011 before moving to Glasgow City in June 2013.

International career
While a 14–year–old pupil at Dalziel High School, Thomson scored winning goals for Scotland at Under–17 level against Republic of Ireland and Norway at a tournament in France. The vice–captain of the national Under 19 team, Thomson made her first senior appearance for Scotland in May 2012; a 3–1 friendly win over Poland in Gdańsk.

Thomson attended the Scottish Football Association National Performance Centre at the University of Stirling.

International goals
Results list Scotland's goal tally first.

References

External links

1993 births
Living people
Scottish women's footballers
Scotland women's international footballers
Celtic F.C. Women players
Arsenal W.F.C. players
Footballers from Motherwell
People educated at Dalziel High School
Women's association football midfielders